"A" is a fictional character in the Pretty Little Liars franchise. Created by author Sara Shepard in 2006, the character serves as the main antagonist in both the television and book series. It has also appeared in the web series Pretty Dirty Secrets (2012).

Working as an anonymous figure, “A” is a stalker who blackmails, manipulates and tortures the main characters of the franchise.

In the novel series, the first and original "A" was revealed to be Mona Vanderwaal. The second, and final, "A" is revealed as Alison Dilaurentis and her helper as Nick Maxwell.

In the television series, the first and original “A” was revealed to be Mona Vanderwaal. Mona later builds “The A-Team” with the help of the second “Big A,” Charlotte DiLaurentis. The series concluded with the third and final “Uber A” being revealed as Alex Drake, the twin sister of Spencer Hastings.

In the fourth Pretty Little Liars series, Original Sin, Archie Waters takes the identity of "A", working together with his father, Marshall Clanton.

Development

Characterization 
In the original television series, all three characters who take up the identity of "A" are mentally ill women seeking revenge for something that has negatively altered their lives. “A” frequently manipulates, blackmails and tortures.

“A” has a love for riddles and dolls, usually referring the Liars as their own dolls.

In Original Sin and the novels, A kills multiple people in order to achieve their roles.

Novels storylines

The first "A" 
 Real identity: Mona Vanderwaal.
Three years after the disappearance of Alison DiLaurentis, her four friends, Aria Montgomery, Spencer Hastings, Emily Fields, and Hanna Marin, each receives messages from someone calling themselves "A". The girls had drifted apart over the years, so they had no idea that other people were getting texts as well. Additionally, the texts were about secrets only Ali knew about. At first, the messages were simply teasing and all of the girls wonder if their missing friend was the one who sent them. Though they knew she was most likely dead, she was still the only one who knew their darkest secrets. Once Ali's body is discovered in her old backyard, the girls are even more baffled when they continue to receive threats. At Ali's funeral, the girls are reunited and they find out that they've all been receiving weird messages. As the girls stand outside after the funeral ends, they all get a text saying, "I'm still here, bitches. And I know everything. –A".

From that point on, the messages take on a distinctly more threatening tone. Aria is given an ultimatum to tell her mother about her father's affair by midnight after the Foxy event, or A will do it for her. A continues to play life-altering games with the girls, from encouraging suspicion of Spencer's involvement in Ali's death to outing Emily's sexuality to her conservative mother. However, A makes a serious mistake in texting Hanna on the night of Mona's birthday party. Instead of using the plain Blackberry she bought just for tormenting the girls, A accidentally uses his/her own phone. Hanna, who has a new phone without all of her contacts recognizes the number, compelling A to act before Hanna can reveal A's true identity to the others. A hits Hanna with an SUV, successfully destroying Hanna's phone and putting her into a coma that eventually leads to a temporary loss of memory.

A knew that there was a very good chance Hanna would regain her memory. Hanna's best friend, Mona Vanderwaal, informs the girls that she has also received texts from A, drawing the five closer together in trying to figure out who their tormentor is. Mona subtly encourages Spencer's fears that her sister, Melissa, might be A as well as Alison's killer. During Hanna's recovery masquerade celebration, she suddenly regains her memory, revealing that Mona is A. However, she, Emily, and Aria can't do much about it, because Spencer and Mona are on their way to the police station. After Spencer is warned about Mona by text, she tries to escape Mona's car, but Mona catches on rather quickly and diverts to a path in a more remote area of Rosewood. She tells Spencer everything, from seeing Ali launch a firework into Toby Cavanaugh's garage that blinded her friend Jenna, to finding Ali's diary of secrets among a pile of old DiLaurentis junk the St. Germains left at the curb, discovering the girls' secrets that only Ali knew. Her motivation was to get revenge for her friend's blindness, even though Jenna and Ali had planned together to launch the firework. Mona didn't know this and got a scar on her stomach from the ordeal. Mona also drops the bombshell that Ian Thomas killed Ali, due to Ali's last diary entry about giving him an ultimatum to break up with Melissa. She then offers Spencer to become A with her and tell Hanna that she must not be remembering correctly, but she refuses. The two fight at Floating Man's Quarry and Spencer accidentally pushes Mona, who falls and has her neck caught between rocks.

The second "A" 
Real Identity Alison DiLaurentis.
Alison DiLaurentis lived a life which she felt was ruined by her twin sister, Courtney DiLaurentis who was smarter and kinder. Alison began emotionally manipulating Courtney into pretending to be Alison, until she eventually tricked Courtney into pretending to strangle her. Courtney is sent to a mental hospital as a result and the ashamed DiLaurentis's erase all trace of her, Alison becomes Queen Bee at her new school. Courtney is allowed a short trip home to meet with her family, but whilst there sees Spencer, Hannah, Aria and Emily arguing outside and goes out to talk to them. Because of this, her parents believe she is Alison, the real Alison insists she's Alison, but because of her manipulating Courtney into pretending to be her they think she is lying. A vengeful Alison is taken away to the Mental Hospital.

The girls began receiving messages from 'A' again, scaring them greatly. First believing it to be a cruel joke, they then discover Ian Thomas's body which the second 'A' had murdered. 'A' then steals Ian's body convincing everyone else that it was a hoax. 'A' mocks the girls over text and pretends to be Ian on an online account, giving the girls information such as Spencer being the product of an affair between her father and Alison's father. 'A' allows Spencer to be scammed out of 2 thousand dollars, taunts Aria with photos, manipulates Hanna so she is sent to a mental hospital and forces Emily to go to Lancaster to look into Wilden. 'A' sends the girls on many searches to try and find who 'A' could be and murders Jenna. They eventually plant all the evidence of a random person. The girls are fooled by this, happy it is over.

The town is introduced to Courtney DiLaurentis who is Alison's ill twin sister who was kept in many clinics and hidden from the world. Courtney reveals herself to the girls as actually being Alison and that Courtney was pretending to be her and she was the one who ran into the random person and died. Aria is suspicious, along with Wilden and Melissa, Melissa knew about the twins for a while because of Jason and Alison's stories don't match up with what Jason told her. The suspected murderer has an alibi and people begin digging up suspicious things about Ali. Ali kidnaps Melissa and traps her in a cupboard next to Ian's dead body.

At Ali's house, all of the girls get drunk and re-enact the day Ali went missing, they wake up to find a letter revealing that Courtney took Alison's place when they were young and the person the girls were friends with was actually Courtney whilst Alison was sent to a mental hospital in her place. When she came back, Alison killed Courtney. Ali sets the house on fire with the girls in it, but they manage to turn the tables on her and escape with Melissa. The girls hope she was killed in the explosion, but Emily left the door open for her.

After the third 'A', Nick, has been arrested in her escape, Alison escapes to a house even Nick had no clue about and uses all of Nick's money for plastic surgery. Then, under a new alias, she begins tormenting the girls again. An obsessed fan-group starts harassing the girls and she hires one, named Greg, to infiltrate the Liars. He starts dating Spencer in hopes to do this, which works. She also pretends to be a famous artists secretary to ruin Aria's potential career. She attempts to drown Emily in a pool for rejecting her, and then murders her girlfriend Jordan which drives Emily to depression. Alison then frames the girls for her torture and murder by covering a house they broke into with her blood and weapons, they are arrested.

Ali is able to avoid the girls as they attempt to find her before they are inevitably imprisoned. Alison is elated to discover she has driven Emily to drown herself and made Aria flee the country. Little did she know, Emily faked her death and managed to track Alison to her mothers house where she was hiding out. Alison confronts Emily with a gun and the two fight, with Emily holding off Ali long enough for the police to arrive. Alison is then arrested and the girls exonerated.

The third "A" 
Real Identity Nick Maxwell.
A third 'A' begins tormenting the girls. Emily hopes it's Alison, and the rest of the girls hope it's not, however it is likely she survived the explosion. 'A' is more violent than the previous ones, starting off by mainly just tormenting the girls about all of their difficult situations such as Spencer framing Kelsey, Hanna framing Madison, Emily having a baby and the Jamaica Incident. They then reveal that they in fact killed Tabitha, not the girls as they previously thought, and four people are killed by them - Tabitha, Gayle, Kyla, and Graham and many more injured. The girls suspect that this 'A' isn't just Alison as she isn't strong enough to do all of the heavy loading and that this is in fact an accomplice of hers.

The girls are lured to a basement where Alison reveals herself to be alive, but she isn't 'A', the third 'A' is actually Nick Maxwell. Courtney's older boyfriend who met the real Alison at his mental clinic. He had introduced himself to the girls as different people throughout there lives. Phineas, someone who sold Spencer drugs and got her addicted to them and eventually causing her to frame Kelsey for having drugs. Jackson, a bartender who refused to help Hanna and causing her to get into a car crash with Madison. Olaf, Aria's Icelandic friend who stole a painting with her. Derrick, Emily's colleague who she would regularly gossip too. Nick and Alison have put a shrine to Ali in the basement and are going to make it seem as if the girls have killed themselves in honour of Alison. They leave and flood the basement with poisonous gas, but Nick is found and arrested by police as well as the girls being saved. Alison escapes and abandons Nick to prison.

Nick is later visited in prison by the girls and tells them Alison may be at his grandma's house or something connecting to her may be there.

Television storylines

Pretty Little Liars

Original "A" 
Original A was the first "A" and revealed to be Mona Vanderwaal. Mona began torturing Alison by sending her gifts, threats and soon attacking her while wearing a zombie costume. "A" continued to mess with Ali and her mother Jessica DiLaurentis, whom she believed it to be Spencer Hastings. After Alison's disappearance, "A" went away for a year but after the corpse of Bethany Young (believed to be Alison at the time) was found, she reemerged. "A" began sending the Liars messages about things only Alison knew about them and soon even began messing with their parents. Doctor Anne Sullivan had previously dealt with the person behind the hoodie and when "A" trashed her office she immediately recognized the person. She almost exposes her identity to the Liars but "A" kidnaps her and went as far as to threaten her son's life. But the Liars are still close to figuring it out and during the second half of season two they manage to get a hold of "A's" phone. They hatch a plan to catch her with this and it works. They find out that "A" had a lair at the Lost woods resort and Spencer and Mona ("A's" newest victim) head over there and find a room full of pictures of Alison and the girls along with a sketch of "A's" costume to the ball, The Black Swan. However, Spencer begins to notice other clues and soon realizes "A" is right there with her. She turns around to see Mona in a black hoodie, who reveals herself as "A". She kidnaps Spencer and gives her an opportunity to join the "A" team but Spencer declines and the two get into a fight, where Mona is pushed off of a cliff. Though Mona survives, she is sent to Radley Sanitarium for medical assistance. While in the psychiatric hospital, Mona takes up a partnership suggested by the then unknown CeCe Drake that starts off the second game. After this, Mona became another henchmen in the "A" hierarchy, obeying the orders of CeCe, whom she knew as Red Coat. Mona was kicked off of the A-Team in the season three finale. However, Mona joins the new "A.D." team in Season 7, after "A.D." sends Wren to kill her and she offers to help instead. She helps them kidnap Spencer and wears a Melissa mask, but ultimately turns on them and brings the Liars to them, as well as a cop. However, this turns out to be a ruse and the "cop" is actually Mona's French boyfriend, who helps her take Mary and Alex (the two remaining members) to France to live in her own personal Dollhouse. Mona is the final "A" of the series, being the "winner" of the game...

Big "A" 
Big A was the person who took over the "A" game from Mona Vanderwaal after she was admitted to Radley Sanitarium and revealed to be CeCe Drake (A.K.A. Charlotte DiLaurentis or Charles Dilaurentis). She had visited Mona in Radley and used her to get information about the Liars before taking over the game herself and had used the A-Team, which consisted of her ally Sara, Jenna, Noel, Wren, Wilden, Mona, Toby, Lucas, Melissa, and Spencer, to do her dirty work and sometimes went under the Red Coat disguise. Big A often hid out at a lair situated in Room A at an apartment building at Mayflower Hill and a mobile RV which was stolen but Toby gave it back to "A" in exchange for information about his mother's death. It is revealed that Charlotte had been hiding out in the basement of the DiLaurentis house and drilled holes through the floor to spy on the family in her Red Coat disguise and shared the identity with Alison. Her disguise as Red Coat was exposed in the fourth season mid finale when Emily was trapped on a saw at Ravenswood and later got into a fight with Aria who discovered her identity and Charlotte later fell off a platform and escaped. In A' Is for Answers", the Liars are under attack by "A" who shoots Ezra Fitz on the rooftop. However, in the fifth-season premiere, the shooter is revealed to be Shana Fring who attempted to kill Alison but was later shoved off a stage by Aria and died from the impact. After all of this, Charlotte fled to France under the Vivian Darkbloom identity to escape custody for Wilden's death but returned. In the series's 100th episode, Charlotte planted a bomb in the Cavanaugh house which detonated, signalling her triumphant return to Rosewood. In season five, CeCe breaks into the Vanderwaal home and kidnaps Mona just as she is about to tell the Liars that Alison is "A" and covers up her kidnapping as a homicide. She then brings Mona to the Dollhouse and tortures her and forces her to dress up and act like Alison. Just as the Liars are being brought to jail, CeCe kidnaps them and tortures them inside the Dollhouse. Inside, the liars discover that Big "A" is named Charlotte DiLaurentis. CeCe/Charlotte reveals herself as "A" and tells her story; saying that she is transgender, was formerly known as Charles DiLaurentis, and became "A" because the Liars were happy that Alison was gone. She worked with Sara Harvey, who was the Black Widow and a decoy Red Coat, and was also responsible for the "death" of Alison and the death of Wilden, and after telling her story, she attempts suicide by jumping off Radley but is stopped. She is admitted to Welby State and her reign as "A" finally ends and stays in the psychiatric hospital for five years. When she is released, Charlotte is murdered by Mona Vanderwaal and her death causes the birth of "A.D.", the new Uber A. After her death, it is revealed that Noel Kahn and Jenna Marshall were also working for Charlotte. It is also revealed that her birth mother is Jessica's twin, Mary Drake, and her birth father is Ted Wilson, while Spencer is her sister. The series finale reveals that "A.D." is her sister and Spencer's twin, Alex Drake, whom Charlotte met after boarding the plane to France. She and Alex become very close after meeting, until Charlotte returned to Rosewood to play the game some more. Alex reveals that Charlotte never returned to her in London and the next time she saw her was when she visited her grave.

Uber "A"
Uber A, also known as A.D., is the third person to take over the identity of "A". In the show's series finale, Uber A's identity is revealed to be Alex Drake, Spencer's twin sister who was put up for adoption at birth. She desperately craves vengeance over the tragic passing of Charlotte DiLaurentis, who was her half-sister, and is trying to seek out the person responsible. Unlike Mona or Charlotte, Alex does not use any nicknames at first but instead signs their messages with emojis, which differentiates her from the A-Team. This causes Caleb to nickname her Amoji. However, in the sixth-season finale, she begins using the alias "A.D." and kidnaps Hanna, whom she believes is accountable for her sister's homicide. Hanna manages to escape Uber A's clutches and Alex goes after Alison, who the Liars suggested as guilty for her own cousin's murder. Uber A eventually finds out that Alison is innocent after searching her jacket. While Uber A does work on their own, she also works through a new "A-Team" of helpers, known to consist of Jenna Marshall, Sydney Driscoll, and Aria Montgomery, who are assisting them in completing the endgame. The series finale explains that Alex Drake was put up for adoption in exchange for a sum of money (for Mary), but then left at an orphanage by her adopted parents who were concerned for their image. She ran away from the orphanage at ten years old and eventually started working in a bar in London, where Wren Kingston mistook her for Spencer, revealing the existence of Alex's twin and Charlotte. Wren introduces Charlotte and Alex in an airport (just after Charlotte met Archer Dunhill) and they immediately connect, becoming very close in a short amount of time. After Charlotte is released from Welby, she tells Alex that she wishes to return to Rosewood and resume the game, but Alex says she shouldn't go unless she gets to come too, since she wants to meet Spencer. Charlotte says no and describes the Hastings as "toxic people" before leaving for Rosewood, where she was murdered by Mona. Alex is enraged and forces Wren to shoot her so that she looks exactly like Spencer and can successfully impersonate her. She then goes to Rosewood and picks up the game as "Uber A". Alex has made several appearances where she impersonates Spencer, including, but not limited to: The run in with Ezra at the airport where she introduced Wren, the kiss between "Spencer" and Toby just before the latter planned to leave Rosewood with Yvonne, and Hanna's "dream" where she "hallucinated" Spencer while A.D held her hostage. The latter was done so that Alex could find out whether Hanna was telling the truth about killing Charlotte.

Original Sin 
In Original Sin, A is revealed to be Archie Waters. Archie is the illegitimate son of Rose Waters and Marshall Clanton, whose clandestine affair during high school resulted in Rose's pregnancy with Archie and his twin sister, Angela. Rose never let Archie out of the house and keep his existence a secret because he has a disfigured face. Later, Clanton became the vice-principal of Millwood High School and Rose returned so Angela can attend the school and have proper education. He and Rose decided to not tell Angela his identity as her father. In high school, Angela desperately wanted to fit in and joined Davie Adams's popular group. The group often did their best to embarrass, humiliate, and degrade Angela.

When Angela was raped by Davie's boyfriend, Tom Beasley, Davie forced the group to turn their backs on her. Davie made sure everyone in the school treated her as invisible and worthless. During a New Year's Eve party in 1999, Angela committed suicide in public after her pleas for help was ignored by everyone.

22 years later, Archie take the identity of "A" to help his father avenge Angela and begins killing people who are considered bullies.

The A-Team 
The A-Team is a group of anonymous characters that worked together as "A". The team would work under the orders of the "A" in charge, who has been Mona Vanderwaal, the original leader and founder, CeCe Drake, the second leader, and Alex Drake, the final leader. Alex's team is also referred to as the "A.D.-Team".

Members

Sara Harvey 
Sara was the right-hand woman to Charlotte and also revealed as an A-Team member halfway throughout the sixth season. She has also been a Red Coat and was revealed as the Black Widow. She then became Charlotte's friend and ally in the "A" game and assisted her in most of her schemes. Sara was allegedly diagnosed with Stockholm syndrome following Charlotte's arrest but later discloses to Alison that she lied under oath, also admitting that she and Charlotte were, in fact, close friends and she felt as though they were sisters. Later, Sara was possibly enlisted by Jenna Marshall and Noel Kahn (and possibly "A.D.") to work with them. However, Sara was killed by Noel after she tried to reveal more than she should to Emily._

Sydney Driscoll 
Sydney was Uber A's helper for a brief period of time. She is first seen communicating with them through text messages when she makes a donation under their name at the Vogel Vision Institute. When Aria and Emily confront her, Driscoll claims that she is simply representing a client who prefers to remain anonymous. However, she returns in the following episode and reveals herself to be "A.D.". She offers Aria the chance to join their team, but Aria realizes that Sydney is communicating with someone through an earpiece, revealing that she's just a minion. Aria asks her why she would join their tormentor and Driscoll replies that she wants to be part of the "winning team". However, Uber A, who reveals herself as Spencer's twin sister Alex Drake, reveals in the series finale that Sydney wasn't involved in the Blind School shooting and joined the A-Team because Alex found out she had been stealing from a bank and she fit the hoodie.

Toby Cavanaugh 
Toby was recruited by Mona to join the A-Team when he got a job in Bucks County. When this happened, Spencer found out on the night she was planning their anniversary dinner. His participation in the team was revealed in the finale of Season 3A. He worked hand in hand with Mona and did most of the dirty work for the team, like running down Lucas and attacking Hanna. However, like Mona, he didn't know the identity of Red Coat. Spencer finds out about his betrayal and goes off the deep end, especially after discovering his corpse. However, it is revealed that he is alive and well, with the corpse being a trick by Mona and Red Coat that he says he didn't know about until after. He is also revealed to be a double agent and gets kicked off the team.

Spencer Hastings 
Spencer joined the A-Team briefly near the ending of the third season after being told Toby joined previously she thought this was a way to keep close to him.  Initially, Spencer was extremely determined to be part of the team. However, she later unfolds the truth behind the disappearance of Toby and became a double agent as well. Like Toby, she got kicked off from the team. She is the "A" who kidnapped Malcolm, causing a break up between Ezra and Aria.

Lucas Gottesman 
Lucas was the personal assistant to Mona. He was blackmailed by Mona and the A-Team into sending texts and doing their dirty work. Lucas claims his blackmail began after Mona discovered he was selling test answers. However, Mona later discloses that Lucas was the "A" who gave Emily a massage back in the second season while Mona was off riding with Hanna. During the seventh-season episode "Hold Your Piece", Pastor Ted Wilson reveals to Hanna that he used to run a summer camp for troubled boys, and Charlotte was a camper there prior to her transition. Wilson is disheartened when describing that he interacted with his offspring without awareness they were related. Ted then showcases Hanna a picture of himself back when he worked at the camp, chaperoning Charles and Lucas, whom he described as his son's "only friend".

Melissa Hastings 
Melissa was blackmailed by Mona into wearing the Black Swan disguise to the Masquerade Ball in order to distract Jenna. Mona threatened to reveal her fake pregnancy if she didn't obey her orders. Later, Melissa got onto the Halloween Train dressed as the Queen of Hearts and drugged Aria. Melissa and Wilden then attempted to push her off of the train in a box with Garrett's dead body. It is implied that she was once again blackmailed. It is implied in "A Dark Ali" that Melissa is once again working for "A", as she is seen handing a recording (presumed stolen by "A") to a man resembling Cyrus Petrillo and later implies to Spencer that "A" has something in store for Ali and the Liars.

Darren Wilden 
Wilden was also part of the team as he was the Queens of Hearts responsible for trying to kill Aria. He also murdered Garrett Reynolds, fearing he'd expose him as a crooked cop and placed his corpse in a box beside a fainted Aria. Wilden's reasoning for helping the team is unknown but implied to be blackmail.

Jenna Marshall 
Jenna was a member of the A-Team during the reign of Big A and was also working anonymously for Uber A. She returns to Rosewood in Season 7 and in "Along Comes Mary" and befriends Sara Harvey. Meanwhile, Aria Montgomery and Emily Fields discover that Jenna was on Archer's payroll for unknown reasons. On the episode's closing scene, Jenna and Sara are having drinks at The Radley when an unknown figure approaches the two and reveals themselves to be Noel Kahn, who proceeds to join the duo. When confronted by Emily in regards to her involvement with Archer during "Wanted: Dead or Alive", Jenna admits she befriended Charlotte DiLaurentis after reading about her stay at Welby and reached out. In a flashback, Charlotte enlists Jenna's help to track down the whereabouts of her birth mother and come up with an alias for Archer. The pseudonym "Elliott Rollins" was later created so Archer could deliberately meet Alison and take advantage of her good intentions to benefit Charlotte's eventual release from the psychiatric hospital. In "The DArkest Knight", all of the Liars get a text message, ordering them to head over to 1465, Elm Street. After being lured to an abandoned school for blind students, they're held hostage by Noel and Jenna, tracking them down at gunpoint. During the cat-and-mouse chase, Jenna takes aim at the Liars only to backfire, until a second gunshot is heard and it injures Spencer. As Marshall prepares to finish her off, Mary Drake suddenly emerges from behind and knocks her out. While Drake attempts to help Spencer, an unknown figure drags Jenna away from the building. On the closing scene of the episode, the anonymous entity places her in the back of a van, while she questions them if they were responsible for the gunshot that hit Spencer. As the mysterious figure proceeds to rip off an old man's mask and toss it over to Jenna's side, Marshall feels it up and realizes that A.D. was the one who rescued her. At the end of "Playtime", Jenna is seated in A.D.'s lair, sipping tea. She thanks the unidentified individual for the drink and reminds them of their promise to update her on the "game". Dressed in a nurse's uniform, A.D. drops a binder on Marshall's lap with pages of information written in braille. After Jenna reads a paragraph, she mutters the word "endgame" and grins in delight. During "These Boots Were Made for Stalking",  Jenna walks into the police station in order to come clean about her actions and interrupts a conversation between Spencer and detective Marco Furey. Marshall reports that she kept a low profile after the events that took place at the abandoned school for blind students to avoid being harmed by Noel. According to Jenna, Noel was accountable for Sara Harvey's homicide and she feared to be his ensuing victim. Kahn recruited Jenna with the assertion that Charlotte left enough money in her will to afford Marshall another eye surgery. Nevertheless, Jenna suspected Noel of stealthily plotting to steal the cash all to himself since his parents had financially cut him off. In an attempt to spare her life, Marshall brought a gun to the deserted sight school as an act of self-defense and pretended to hold a grudge against the Liars. After Jenna describes her side of the story, Furey orders one of his associates to escort Marshall to a conference room so she can make an official statement. As Jenna exits the room, Spencer claims that she's an unreliable narrator. However, Furey informs Spencer that the authorities don't have enough evidence against Marshall because the bullet that injured Spencer didn't match the gun found at the location. Later in the episode, Caleb confronts Jenna stating that the authorities were already detecting holes in her allegations. However, Marshall assures Caleb they won't be able to prosecute her since Noel was the only person who could contradict her statement. In the series finale, Spencer's twin, Alex Drake, is revealed to be "A.D.". She reveals that Jenna was looking for her and recruited Noel to help. However, Jenna was desperate for another chance to see and offered to help her in the game.

Noel Kahn 
Noel Kahn served as one of Big A/Charlotte's former minions and worked for her at the Dollhouse, having been responsible for placing blood all over Spencer Hastings to convince she had hurt someone. Noel became the prime suspect for Uber A, particularly after Alison reveals that he was the one who pushed the girl down a flight of stairs during the UPenn frat party. Hanna abducts him at the end of "The Wrath of Kahn" in an attempt to obtain a video confession that proves he's "A.D."/Uber A. In the following episode "The DArkest Knight", she instead ends up slashing his leg with a knife in order to test his DNA and see if it matches Mary Drake's. The results later come back negative and Kahn ends up escaping. Noel and Jenna later lure the Liars to an abandoned school for blind students so they could be held hostage and eventually murdered. During a cat-and-mouse chase, Kahn ends up stumbling upon an axe that decapitates his head after failing to fight Emily and Hanna. In the following episode, "Playtime", Detective Marco Furey informs Spencer that Jenna and Noel frequently visited Archer Dunhill at Welby. During "These Boots Were Made for Stalking", Jenna walks into the police station in order to come clean about her actions and interrupts a conversation between Spencer and detective Marco Furey. Marshall reports that she kept a low profile after the events that took place at the abandoned school for blind students to avoid being harmed by Noel. According to Jenna, Noel was accountable for Sara Harvey's homicide and she feared to be his ensuing victim. Kahn recruited Jenna with the assertion that Charlotte left enough money in her will to afford Marshall another eye surgery. Nevertheless, Jenna suspected Noel of stealthily plotting to steal the cash all to himself since his parents had financially cut him off. In an attempt to spare her life, Marshall brought a gun to the deserted sight school as an act of self-defense and pretended to hold a grudge against the Liars. However, when Caleb later confronts Jenna about the authorities detecting holes in her allegations, she informs him that the only person who could contradict her side of the story was Noel. It is unknown if Noel knew Jenna was working for "A.D." and was also working for them or if Jenna was working for "A.D." separately from their operation.

Aria Montgomery 
Aria is "A.D.'s" helper. Aria is given the offer to join the team in "Power Play". She accepts in the following episode and begins supplying information to Uber A. After the Liars discover Lucas' graphic novel, Aria is sent by Uber A to retrieve it. Once she delivers it, she is given an "A" hoodie in return. She breaks into Alison's house sporting the disguise and trashes the nursery for her baby. In the next episode, Aria is sent by "A.D." to deliver a "gift" to the Hastings family. She connects to their Bluetooth and leaves a burner phone there to play a video recording of Peter and Mary discussing Jessica's murder. She later gets back into her "A" disguise and breaks into Alison's house to put the puzzle piece onto the game board and retrieve her file. "A.D." contacts Aria again and gives her a phone to communicate on. "A.D." asks Aria to meet them and to wear the uniform to do so. Mona overhears the call and tells the Liars of Aria's involvement with the A-Team. Aria gets into her "A" hoodie and goes to meet "A.D.", only to be confronted by the Liars. She then officially defects from the team and rejoins the Liars.

Mary Drake 
Mary joins the A.D.-Team after the time jump, when Mona breaks her out of prison for Alex and she then helps Alex with kidnapping Spencer and keeping her locked away in the bunker. When Alex tries to kill Spencer, Mary tries to convince her to just keep her locked up, but Alex refuses and punches her to keep her from interfering. Mary and Alex are then kidnapped by Mona and kept as her dolls in her own personal dollhouse. Mary is also Jessica DiLaurentis' killer and implied to be the "A" who buried her. It is unknown if Mary was on the A-Team prior to the series finale or was simply forced into joining to keep Spencer locked up.

Wren Kingston 
Wren was a member of the A-Team and is one of the helpers to Alex/Uber A. He helped CeCe/Charlotte sneak into Radley with fake visitors passes to visit Mona and later informs her of Alex's existence. When Alex takes over, he shoots her so that she will have the same scar as Spencer and then later comes to Welby to kill Mona as "A.D." for Alex, only stopping once Mona says she can help get Mary out. Alex kills Wren so that she doesn't have to break up with him in order to get her endgame wishes. Despite Wren being the only person to know almost everything about Alex's game, he doesn't participate much during the actual game, only doing a few things for Alex.

Other "A's"

Shana Fring 
Shana pretended to be "A" to attack the Liars in New York. She donned a black hoodie and attacked them at the coffee shop, only to end up shooting Ezra instead, who had found out her identity. In the following episode, she continued to hunt down the Liars, and sent a group of black hoodies to trick them. The black hoodies used the alias "A" during their taunting of the Liars. Shana revealed herself to the girls and revealed that she wanted justice for Jenna. The Liars falsely believed that Shana was Big A.

Disguises 
Although typically wearing a signature black hoodie and gloves, “A” has worn a variety of disguises in the television series to spy on the Liars at various parties and events.

Red Coat 
Red Coat is a disguise used by two members of the A-Team. Consisting of a knee length red trench coat, black skinny jeans and black heeled ankle boots, CeCe Drake took on the disguise to lead the A-Team and go out in public.
Drake also hired Sara Harvey to act as a decoy whenever she couldn't sport the disguise in her assignments. Alison DiLaurentis occasionally used the disguise to protect her friends without revealing she was alive.

The Black Widow 
The Black Widow is a previously anonymous character who attended detective Darren Wilden's funeral in 'A' Is for A-l-i-v-e". The disguise is all black clothing, with her face concealed by a black veil. The Black Widow is later shown to be a part of the A-Team, when she is seen inside the "A" R.V. placing a Mona doll with the rest of the "A" doll collection. She then lifts up her veil to reveal a burned Ali mask underneath, revealing that she was the Red Coat at the Lodge. In the fifth season, the disguise is seen inside one of "A's" lairs. In "Game Over, Charles", it is revealed that Sara Harvey was the Black Widow. Charlotte sent her to Wilden's funeral to make sure he was deceased. In "Of Late I Think of Rosewood", Sara shows up to Charlotte's funeral in a variation of the disguise, though this time revealing her face.

In a nightmare that Alison had during "How the 'A' Stole Christmas", her mom, Jessica DiLaurentis shows up as the Black Widow.

The Queen of Hearts 
The Queen of Hearts is a previously anonymous character that made an appearance during the third season's Halloween special, "This Is a Dark Ride". In the fourth season's premiere, it is revealed that there were actually two of them in the Halloween train, Melissa Hastings and Darren Wilden. Wilden attacked Spencer and fought Paige, while Melissa drugged Aria and took her body. Wilden also murdered Garrett Reynolds fearing he'd expose his corrupt activities and Melissa later admits to Spencer that she was blackmailed into doing his bidding. However, in Mona's footage, evidence shows that Wilden tried to abandon the train and Melissa is heard ordering him to stay. Wilden would later place a fainted Aria in a box beside Garrett's corpse and then gathered with Melissa in an attempt to push them off the train. They fled the scene once Aria regained her consciousness and stabbed Wilden.

The Black Swan 
The Black Swan is a previously anonymous character that made an appearance during the Masquerade Ball. Melissa was revealed to be the person behind the disguise in "Birds of a Feather". She claimed that "A" (Mona) threatened her, stating that her false pregnancy would've been exposed if she did not distract Jenna during the event. The disguise is inspired by Odile from Swan Lake.

References 

Pretty Little Liars characters
Literary characters introduced in 2006
Fictional murderers
Fictional kidnappers
Fictional hackers
Fictional stalkers
Fictional blackmailers
Female literary villains
American female characters in television